Marie Clémence Lesson (March 2 1800 – August 4 1834) was an illustrator and the second wife of French ornithologist René Lesson, who she married in 1827.  She trained as a natural history artist in Paris and her illustrations appear in her husband's book Histoire Naturelle des Oiseaux-Mouches.
Her father was the French zoologist Charles Dumont de Sainte-Croix. Lesson died of Cholera in 1834.

References

1800 births
1834 deaths
French illustrators
Deaths from cholera